is a passenger railway station operated by the Takamatsu-Kotohira Electric Railroad in Takamatsu, Kagawa, Japan.  It is operated by the private transportation company Takamatsu-Kotohira Electric Railroad (Kotoden) and is designated station "K07". The station name refers to Japan National Route 193, which passes above the station by an overpass. Route 193 connects downtown Takamatsu to Takamatsu Airport in the south. The city of Takamatsu operates a park and ride lot near the station.

Lines
Kūkō-dōri  Station is a statin on the Kotoden Kotohira Line and is located 9.0 km from the opposing terminus of the line at Takamatsu-Chikkō Station.

Layout
The station consists of a single side platform serving one bi-directional track. The station is unattended.

Adjacent stations

History
Kūkō-dōri Station opened on July 29, 2006

Surrounding area
Japan National Route 193

Passenger statistics

See also
 List of railway stations in Japan

References

External links

  

Railway stations in Japan opened in 2006
Railway stations in Takamatsu